"Just the Two of Us" is a song by American rapper Will Smith. It was released as the fourth single from his debut solo studio album, Big Willie Style (1997), on July 20, 1998. The song was inspired by Bill Withers' and Grover Washington, Jr.'s love song of the same title; Smith's version samples and incorporates lyrics from the original. Instead of love between a couple, "Just the Two of Us" focuses on the relationship between a father and son. The song features Fuzzy and Sauce from the R&B group Somethin' for the People with Fuzzy providing the chorus and ad-libs, while Sauce is a credited as a producer on the track.

The song reached number 20 on the US Billboard Hot 100. It was also a top-five hit in the UK, reaching number two, and entered the top 20 in Iceland, Ireland, and New Zealand. The accompanying music video features Smith playing with his son, Trey, as well as numerous clips of several other famous men with their children. The song was parodied by Eminem in his track "'97 Bonnie & Clyde" and by Dr. Evil in the 1999 film Austin Powers: The Spy Who Shagged Me. It was also sampled in "Pretty Girl Rock" by Keri Hilson.

Music video
The music video, directed by Bob Giraldi, begins with Smith playing with his son, Trey. Before the song starts, Trey says, "Now, dad, this is a very sensitive subject." The remainder of the video features clips of fathers with their children, including Smith playing with Trey, and other celebrity fathers, including Babyface, Montell Jordan, James Lassiter, Keenen Wayans, Brian McKnight, Magic Johnson, and Muhammad Ali (whom Smith later played in a 2001 biopic). The video also features Smith's wife Jada Pinkett Smith pregnant with the couple's first child Jaden, and also features Will's father, younger brother, and two sisters.

Track listings

US CD, 12-inch, and cassette single
 "Just the Two of Us" (radio edit) – 4:19
 "Just the Two of Us" (Rodney Jerkins remix featuring Brian McKnight) – 4:14
 "Just the Two of Us" (Spanish version featuring DLG) – 4:10
 "Just the Two of Us" (Korean version featuring Turbo) – 5:12
 "Just the Two of Us" (instrumental) – 5:15

UK CD1
 "Just the Two of Us" (radio edit) – 4:19
 "Just the Two of Us" (Love to Infinity's classic club mix) – 7:16
 "Just the Two of Us" (Love to Infinity's giant club mix) – 6:46

UK CD2
 "Just the Two of Us" (album version) – 5:15
 "Just the Two of Us" (Love to Infinity's classic radio mix) – 4:01
 "Just the Two of Us" (Love to Infinity's extended R&B mix) – 4:45

UK cassette single and European CD1
 "Just the Two of Us" (radio edit) – 4:19
 "Just the Two of Us" (Love to Infinity's classic radio mix) – 4:01

European CD2
 "Just the Two of Us" (radio edit) – 4:19
 "Just the Two of Us" (Love to Infinity's classic radio mix) – 4:05
 "Just the Two of Us" (Love to Infinity's classic club mix) – 7:15
 "Just the Two of Us" (Love to Infinity's extended R&B mix) – 4:44

Australian CD single
 "Just the Two of Us" (radio edit)
 "Just the Two of Us"
 "Just the Two of Us" (instrumental)
 "Gettin' Jiggy wit It"

Charts and certifications

Weekly charts

Year-end charts

Certifications

Release history

References

1998 singles
1998 songs
Columbia Records singles
MTV Video Music Award for Best Male Video
Music videos directed by Bob Giraldi
Songs about fathers
Songs written by Bill Withers
Songs written by Will Smith
Will Smith songs